The Waitangi River is a river of the Northland Region of New Zealand's North Island. It originates close to the northern shore of Lake Ōmāpere and flows eastwards to the Bay of Islands. It is considered to end either where it drops over Haruru Falls into a tidal estuary, or where the estuary opens into Te Tī Bay, just below the bridge between the historic locality of Waitangi and the town of Paihia.

See also
List of rivers of New Zealand

References

Rivers of the Northland Region
Rivers of New Zealand